Tiananmen Exiles: Voices of the Struggle for Democracy in China is a scholarly book by Rowena Xiaoqing He, published by Palgrave Macmillan in April 2014. The book has been named one of the Top five China Books by the Asia Society. It is primarily an oral history of Yi Danxuan, Shen Tong, and Wang Dan, all exiled student leaders from the 1989 Tiananmen Movement in China. "Tracing the life trajectories of these exiles, from childhood during Mao's Cultural Revolution, adolescence growing up during the reform era, and betrayal and punishment in the aftermath of June 1989, to ongoing struggles in exile", the author explores, "how their idealism was fostered by the very powers that ultimately crushed it, and how such idealism evolved facing the conflicts that historical amnesia, political commitment, ethical action, and personal happiness presented to them in exile." Dan Southerland notes in Christian Science Monitor that the book provides "fresh insights and an appreciation for the challenges that exiled Chinese student leaders faced after they escaped from China." Paul Levine from American Diplomacy states that there was “a fourth major character: the author herself.” Tiananmen Exiles is a part of the Palgrave Studies in Oral History and contains a foreword by Perry Link. The forward was published in the New York Review of Books the same week the book came out.

Author 
Rowena Xiaoqing He was born in China and was raised as a part of the "Tiananmen Generation". She received her M.A. and Ph.D degrees from the University of Toronto and conducted her postdoctoral research at Harvard's Fairbank Center for Chinese Studies. She is a current member at the Institute for Advanced Study at Princeton (2018-2019) working on her manuscript on history, memory, and Chinese student nationalism in the Post-Tiananmen era. As of 2019, she is Associate Professor of History at the Chinese University of Hong Kong. She has previously taught at Harvard University, Wellesley College, and St. Michael's College.

In her profile interview with the New York Times (in both English and Chinese editions), He details the challenges of "teaching Tiananmen to a generation." In the Tiananmen courses she created, she engaged students to organize symposiums to share what they had learned with the general public, and invited faculty members to serve as chairs and discussants, among them, historian Merle Goldman and political scientist Roderick MacFarquhar, who gave closing remarks each year at the student-initiated symposium. For the 25th anniversary of the Movement, He and her students organized a full-day conference which included panels of academics, journalists, and exiled leaders. Based on a Boston Globe story one freshman student from China "told the packed auditorium" that “I took this class because I am the generation that’s being brainwashed...Everything I knew about June 4, 1989, was the fragments I heard from my dad.”

The Harvard Magazine reports that "the course has not escaped its own controversy. A Chinese man told one student not to take the course because it represented a biased version of history, and each year, some students, usually those from mainland China, ask for their names and appearances to be withheld from the publicly accessible course website." He's teaching has been covered by the Harvard Crimson, Harvard Political Review, the Harvard Magazine the Wellesley News and other international news outlet. She received the Harvard University Certificate of Teaching Excellence three consecutive times. In addition to her scholarly work, He writes and speaks widely outside the academia.

Synopsis 
Rowena He starts with introducing the idea of oral history and addresses her method style, as she swaps between Chinese and English in her interviews, and has combined the methods of life history, narrative inquiry and arts-based inquiry. She starts with an introduction to Wang Dan, Shen Tong, and Yi Danxuan.  Wang Dan was a student leader who was arrested after the protests and served fourteen years in two different sentences, he would later be exiled to the United States and would receive his PhD. Shen Tong co-chaired the Student Dialogue Delegation, escaped China six days after the crackdown, and would later publish the autobiography Almost a Revolution. Tong is also still politically active while in exile. Yi Danxuan was the Vice-President of the Guangzhou Patriotic Student Federation, spent 2 years in prison, and was exiled from China but was allowed temporary entry during the Beijing Olympics.

The book starts with a portion of He's autobiography which tells of her childhood and her connection to the Tiananmen protests. She then tells how her father became disenchanted with the Chinese Communist Party and shows how the school system pushed a pro-Party ideology. She then describes how she exiled herself to Canada and there became excited because of the literature on Tiananmen in the library.

Yi Danxuan was the exile that He was most excited to interview, mainly because of the lack works on him and his efforts outside of Beijing. Yi asked He to “stop thinking about your research for a moment while I talk to you” as the exiles are people and not just subjects; He notes how this was an important moment for herself. In the interview, He asked Yi about his current involvement in the community who were involved in the Tiananmen Protests. She further inquired about his imprisonment, but Yi gave little information to He on this matter. Finally, He inquired on how Yi was settling into the United States, and Yi stated that “I don’t enjoy settling down in North America. I won’t feel happy.”

Shen Tong was one of the more difficult and controversial exiles that He interviewed. The main problem that He faced was that Shen has published his own autobiography, He's solution was to interview him on topics not covered in Almost a Revolution. In doing this she predominantly concentrates on his life prior to 1989 and in exile. When He asked Shen about his family and their reactions to his political activism Shen told He that his father was originally unsupportive but that changed with his exile as “the worst thing had already happened. He didn’t need to worry about me when I was abroad."

Much like with Shen, He was faced the challenge of interviewing Wang Dan who is “a symbol of the crushed democracy movement”; as with Shen, He concentrated on his “formative years as the basis of his later life”. Wang and He highlight throughout dialogue the influence of the Cultural Revolution on those involved in the Tiananmen protest.

The author ends her book with a group dialogue between the exiles. The major ideas focused on during the discussion are the ideas of ‘home’, a desire to return to China and a feeling of guilt for their families left in China. The other major issue discussed is how big of a role June 4 should play in their lives and Wang succinctly stated that “June 4 should not be the only meaningful thing in our lives." The author then ends by showing how the exiles have moved on with their lives after the protest.

Reception 
Tiananmen Exiles has received many positive reviews: 

“Rowena He herself is an example of someone who has battled for years, sometimes in the face of angry criticism, to keep alive the memories of an idealism that emerged in full force in 1989. And she’s determined not to let us forget.” -Christian Science Monitor by Dan Southerland 

"A compelling account of idealism and the price it exacts" - Kirkus

“Bold attempt to reclaim Chinese history from the state” -The Independent by Edward Wilson

"Rowena He...courageously battles state-imposed amnesia, forcing us to remember the human cost of China's 1989" - The Daily Telegraph by Julia Lovell 

"Those who have chosen, or were forced by circumstances, not to live the official lie, including Rowena He, are condemned as traitors to China rather than as critics of the regime. For the three student leaders interviewed in her book, the events of 1989 and their subsequent exile created a permanent post-traumatic state. Much the same could be said of the nation they left behind, a nation that is waiting for the moment when the legacy of the tragedy suffered a quarter-century ago can be faced." - New Statesman by Isabel Hilton

“As long as the Communist Party continues to refuse to tolerate any conversation about June Fourth, it will only ensure that voices like Ms. He’s echo even louder in the silence." - The Wall Street Journal Real Time by Maura Cunningham

Noted journalist Ian Johnson writes in the New York Review of Books that He's book is “A moving and very personal account of life as a political emigrant" and "a convincing and powerful account of a central experience in contemporary Chinese life."

Princeton Historian Yu Ying-shih comments that "Rowena Xiaoqing He has ingeniously reconstructed the entire movement in a historical perspective not only to unlock the past and explain the present but also to peer into the future of China's sustained struggle against totalitarian tyranny."

Vera Schwartz comments that “Rowena He’s book is an essential corrective," to the "complex legacy of Tiananmen:"Through her own writings and ongoing testimony about the events of 1989, she has refused to let the hope for democracy wither under the weight of platitudes and Party-imposed amnesia. The cost of this act of moral courage has been very high...The lonely few keep educating themselves about the vague ideals that they carried as youths into Tiananmen Square. They refuse to become deaf to history’s trauma, in the way that Primo Levi feared for the generation after the Holocaust.

The Journal of East Asian Libraries notes that "Tiananmen Exiles has organically tied the Cultural Revolution and Tiananmen movement together through the lives and agonies of three former student leaders, and through them, the lives and struggles of their generation."Bjorn Alpermann states that He's book “is a valuable contribution to the literature on the Chinese democracy movement and provides fascinating insights into the world of Chinese political exiles,” however, “the 'infighting' among the exiled dissidents—apparently an important consideration to all three of the interviewees—is only alluded to,” as He seems to concentrate more on the “questions of identity and citizenship.”

James Seymour points what is supposedly a shortcoming, namely, the second chapter, He's personal story, as it “is somewhat less successful than the others because it has little to do with the Tiananmen experience.”  He herself has detailed the literature of her narrative history approach under Against Amnesia: Narrative as a Quest and Who Am I as a Researcher in Chapter One. Vera Schwarcz also notes in the Human Rights Quarterly, He's narrative approach is a “methodology of oral history” “indebted to a new trend which encourages narrative and autobiographical engagement with the subject.” Ian Johnson, too, in the New York Review of Books, explains that:Her book is written in the tradition of contemporary academic narrative research, which invites her to tell her own story as a way of making clear her standpoint. We learn of her upbringing during the Cultural Revolution, the problems her family faced, and how her father’s idealism was crushed during the Mao period…All of this helps us understand the sense of entrapment that the Tiananmen generation felt growing up during the Mao era, and the resulting desire to break out and embrace the 1989 movement.Seymour's second criticism is that readers who have read “the [autobiographical] accounts of Shen Tong and Wang Dan will not find much that is new here,” however “we do learn a lot about Wang’s formative years,” and the controversial aspect of Shen's political career. Regarding this, in He's chapter dedicated to Shen Tong, she refers specifically to the relationship between her profile of Shen Tong and the autobiography that Shen had published many years earlier (1990):This chapter might be viewed as a continuation of the autobiography, shifting the focus from Sheng Tong’s socialization in China prior to 1989 to his experience in exile. Readers will find in this chapter Shen Tong’s firsthand reflections about his life in exile with respect to his prior experiences in China as well as new perspectives on each episode of his life that were derived from the interview and group discussions. Unlike other studies on the Tiananmen uprising that mainly focus on the causes and progression of the uprising, here I am concerned with the full lives and struggles of these exile students from their own personal perspectives.In what is a very positive review in The Spectator, Jonathan Mirsky states that there are “few factual errors do not detract from this book’s masterly narrative and analysis.” This is in reference to He's statement that the “1989 Tiananmen movement was the most serious open conflict between the communist regime and the Chinese people since the establishment of the People’s Republic in 1949.” Mirsky deems this an error: God knows it was ghastly enough, but the first years of the communist period, when Mao’s bloodthirstiness was encouraged by Deng Xiaoping and Zhou Enlai, witnessed the executions of at least two million souls; and during the Cultural Revolution of 1966–1976 many more millions died, including those killed by the army...He’s own parents suffered during those years, but like so many Chinese they scarcely mentioned the horrors of the past to their children; so that even though He is well-versed in her country’s history, that earlier period hasn’t touched her in the way Tiananmen has.The fundamental difference at work here is that the events listed above were political campaigns launched by the CCP against the Chinese people, not social movements when people took to the streets to openly confront the communist regime, and did not constitute "the most serious open conflicts" since 1949.

Mirsky further cites He's book as “profound” in keeping the Tiananmen movement's significance alive.

References 

2014 non-fiction books
Books about China
Books about the 1989 Tiananmen Square protests and massacre
Palgrave Macmillan books